Metriacanthosaurus (meaning "moderately-spined lizard") is a genus of metriacanthosaurid dinosaur from the upper Oxford Clay of England, dating to the Late Jurassic period, about 160 million years ago (lower Oxfordian).

History of discovery

In 1923, German paleontologist Friedrich von Huene wrote a paper on Jurassic and Cretaceous European carnivorous dinosaurs within Saurischia. In this paper, he examined a specimen (OUM J.12144) including an incomplete hip, a leg bone, and part of a backbone, assigning it to a new species of Megalosaurus: Megalosaurus parkeri. The specific name honours W. Parker who in the nineteenth century had collected the fossils near Jordan's Cliff at Weymouth. These bones were from the Oxford Clay Formation, which dates to the Upper Jurassic.

In 1932, however, von Huene concluded it was a species of Altispinax, A. parkeri.

In 1964, scientist Alick Walker decided these fossils were too different from Altispinax, as they lacked the long vertebral spines, and named the new genus Metriacanthosaurus. The generic name is derived from Greek metrikos, "moderate", and akantha, "spine". Metriacanthosaurus thus gets its name from its vertebrae, which are taller than typical carnosaurs, like Allosaurus, but lower than other high-spined dinosaurs like Acrocanthosaurus.

Description
Thomas Holtz gave a length of 8 meters (26.2 feet). Metriacanthosaurus was named for the height of its neural spines, which are actually not overly tall for theropods. They are similar to other theropods such as Megalosaurus, Sinraptor, and Ceratosaurus in being 1.5 times the height of the centrum.

Classification
Originally named as a species of Megalosaurus in Megalosauridae, Metriacanthosaurus has since been reclassified in Metriacanthosauridae. It is thought to be related to genera such as Yangchuanosaurus, and in 1988 Paul synonymized the two genera. However, a 2007 review of British dinosaurs by Darren Naish and David Martill defending keeping the two genera taxonomically separate. Metriacanthosaurus is considered a member of the subfamily Metriacanthosaurinae.

Below is a simplified cladogram of Tetanurae by Matthew Carrano et al. (2012).

References

Metriacanthosaurids
Oxfordian life
Late Jurassic dinosaurs of Europe
Jurassic England
Fossils of England
Fossil taxa described in 1964
Taxa named by Alick Walker